Two for Danger is a 1940 British crime film directed by George King and starring Barry K. Barnes, Greta Gynt and Ian McLean.

It was made at Teddington Studios as a second feature by Warner Brothers.

Cast
 Barry K. Barnes as Tony Grigson
 Greta Gynt as Diana
 Ian McLean as Australian
 Gordon McLeod as German
 Tony Shaw as American
 David Keir as Professor Shaw
 Vera Bogetti as Lady
 Peter Glenville as Young Latin
 Peter Gawthorne as Assistant commissioner
 George Merritt as Inspector Canway
 Wilfrid Caithness as Meason
 Cecil Parker as Sir Richard
 Kynaston Reeves as Doctor George Frencham
 Henry Oscar as Claude Frencham
 Gus McNaughton as Braithwaite

References

Bibliography
 Chibnall, Steve & McFarlane, Brian. The British 'B' Film. Palgrave MacMillan, 2009.

External links

1940 films
1940 crime films
Films directed by George King
Warner Bros. films
Films shot at Teddington Studios
British crime films
British black-and-white films
1940s English-language films
1940s British films